At the 1974 FIFA World Cup, the eight teams that finished in the top two places in each of the initial four groups were split into two further groups of four teams, labelled Group A and Group B. Group B was made up of the winners of Groups 2 and 4 (Yugoslavia and Poland), and the runners-up from Groups 1 and 3 (West Germany and Sweden). Matches were played between 26 June and 3 July 1974 at venues in Düsseldorf, Frankfurt and Stuttgart.

Having each won both of their first two matches, West Germany and Poland went into their final match level on points with a place in the final at stake. West Germany won the match 1–0 and qualified to play against the Netherlands, while Poland finished second and went on to play in the third-place play-off against Brazil.

Qualified teams
The winners of Group 2 and 4 and the runners-up of Group 1 and 3 qualified for Group B of the second round.

Standings

Matches

West Germany vs Yugoslavia

Sweden vs Poland

Poland vs Yugoslavia

West Germany vs Sweden

Poland vs West Germany

Sweden vs Yugoslavia

Notes

References

Group A
West Germany at the 1974 FIFA World Cup
Yugoslavia at the 1974 FIFA World Cup
Sweden at the 1974 FIFA World Cup
Poland at the 1974 FIFA World Cup